The Kreis Domleschg forms, together with the sub-districts of Avers, Rheinwald, Schams and Thusis, the Hinterrhein District of the Canton Graubünden in Switzerland.  The district office is located in Fürstenau.

Geography 
Geographically, the Kreis is located in the lower part of the Hinterrhein, below the Viamala gorge, on the left bank of the river.  This part of the valley is known as the Domleschg/Heinzenberg valley.  The right bank forms the Kreis Thusis.

Municipalities

Mergers
On 1 January 2015 the former municipalities of Almens, Paspels, Pratval, Rodels and Tomils merged to form the new municipality of Domleschg.

References

External links

 

Districts of Graubünden